Fröken Chic (English: Miss Chic) is a 1959 Swedish comedy film, directed by Hasse Ekman.

Plot summary 
The talent agent Buster Carell is near bankruptcy when his biggest talent, a singing lumberjack, runs off with the company funds. While watching a TV quiz show, he discovers Isabella Linder, who sings a little song after winning. Carell seeks her out and offers her a contract. She is not tempted, she wants to stay a school teacher, but Carell is not a man that takes no for an answer.

Cast
Sickan Carlsson as Isabella Linder, teacher
Hasse Ekman as Buster Carell
Meg Westergren as Margareta "Baby" Langenhielm 
Herman Ahlsell as Krister van Boren 
Sif Ruud as Miss Trimling, Busters secretary 
Hjördis Petterson as Rita Rang, writer, Isabellas aunt 
Sigge Fürst as Hagenius
Stig Järrel as Urbàhn, show host in Kvitt eller dubbelt 
Yngve Gamlin as professor Gårdvar, judge in Kvitt eller dubbelt 
Elsa Carlsson as Margit van Boren, countess, Kristers mother 
Olof Sandborg as Hugo van Boren, count, Kristers father 
Carl-Gunnar Wingård as headmaster Malte Rylander

External links

Swedish comedy films
1959 films
Films directed by Hasse Ekman
1950s Swedish-language films
1950s Swedish films